Daniel Lauby (sometimes referred to as Dan Lauby Snr; born March 6, 1960) is an American professional darts player who played in the Professional Darts Corporation (PDC) events. His son Danny Lauby Jr. is also a professional darts player.

Career
Lauby played in four PDC World Darts Championships between 1999 and 2004, although he never won a game. 

Lauby He made his debut of the 1999 World Matchplay, losing to Jamie Harvey of Scotland 5–10 in the last 32.

World Championship performances

PDC
 1999: Last 32: (lost to Mick Manning 1–3) (sets) 
 2000: Last 32: (lost to Graeme Stoddart 2–3)
 2001: Last 32: (lost to Paul Lim 1–3)
 2004: Last 48: (lost to Erik Clarys 0–3)

References

External links

1960 births
Living people
American darts players
Professional Darts Corporation associate players